Rajesh Dhuper (born 2 December 1999) is an Indian cricketer. He made his first-class debut for Odisha in the 2015–16 Ranji Trophy on 1 October 2015. He made his Twenty20 debut for Odisha in the 2017–18 Zonal T20 League on 8 January 2018.

References

External links
 

1999 births
Living people
Indian cricketers
People from Cuttack
Odisha cricketers
Cricketers from Odisha